Těžká Barbora (English: Heavy Barbora) is a Czech satirical play directed against the rising power of the Nazi régime. It was premiered on 5 November, 1937 at Osvobozené divadlo in Prague. The comedians Jan Werich and Jiří Voskovec appeared in the main roles, Jaroslav Ježek created the music.

Plot 
The story depicts a conflict between two fictional noble houses, Eidamští ("Eidams") and Yberlandští ("Yberlands"), the later attacking the former, the former then employing two soldiers (Werich and Voskovec), that build a cheese cannon (Těžká Barbora).

Productions

Divadlo ABC 
Directed by Miroslav Zachata. The play had premiere on 14 June 1960 in ABC Theatre, Prague.
Jan Werich
Miroslav Horníček
Mayor .... Lubomír Kostelka
Ludmila Píchová
Zlatomír Vacek
Stella Zázvorková
Jiří Pick
Jiřina Bohdalová
Stanislav Fišer
Jan Víšek
Václav Trégl
Ivo Niederle
Otto Lackovič
Elena Hálková
Lubomír Bryg
Roman Hemala

Divadlo Radar 
Directed by Radka Tesárková, The play had premiere on 30 November and 1 December 2007 in Radar Theatre, Prague.
Kristian van Bergen, mayor of Eidam City .... Jakub Baran or Vojtěch Klinger
Greta, his unfaithful wife .... Eliška Holzknechtová or Barbora Heřmánková
Hans Bolz, marshal .... Vojtěch Koutek
Elisabeth, his devoted wife .... Markéta Hausnerová or Silvie Průšová or Andrea Včeláková
Gustav Harmoniensis, teacher .... Jakub Hudec
Vandergut, lord of castle .... Matěj Trojan
Siska, mayor's butler .... Anna Kottasová or Kateřina Tvrdíková
Krištof, cheesemaker .... Oliver Cox
Peter, noble foreigner .... Jakub Heřmánek
Shop assistant .... Eliška Holzknechtová or Barbora Heřmánková
1st Citizen of Eidam .... Markéta Hausnerová or Silvie Průšová
2nd Citizen of Eidam .... Anna Štěpánková
3rd Citizen of Eidam .... Lucie Špitálská or Ludmila Švrčinová
Pyšvejcová, 1st schoolchild .... Anna Kottasová or Kateřina Tvrdíková
2nd schoolchild .... Markéta Hausnerová or Andrea Včeláková
3rd schoolchild .... Lucie Špitálská or Ludmila Švrčinová
4th schoolchild .... Kateřina Chadimová or Anna Štěpánková
Captain .... Eliška Holzknechtová or Barbora Heřmánková
Corporal .... Markéta Hausnerová or Silvie Průšová
Jinkney .... Anna Kottasová or Kateřina Tvrdíková
1st Freelance .... Lucie Špitálská or Ludmila Švrčinová
2nd Freelance .... Kateřina Chadimová or Anna Štěpánková

Divadlo A. V. Šembery 
Directed by Josef Víšo. The play had premiere 21 September 2009 in A. V. Šembera Theatre, Vysoké Mýto.
Kristian van Bergen .... Vladimír Martínek
Greta, his unfaithful wife .... Dana Labová
Hans Bolz, marshal of Eidam .... Petr Ryška
Elisabeth, his devoted wife .... Petra Vtípilová
Vanderburg, lord of castle .... Karel Fenik
Gustav Harmoniensis, teacher .... Petr Klofanda
Siska, mayor's butler .... Michaela Kotrbová
Krištof, cheesemaker .... Václav Doležal
Peter, noble foreigner .... Richard  Matoušek
Shop assistant .... Marie Švadlenová
Councillor of Eidam .... Pavel Pešek
Baker Woman .... Martina Štěpánová
Butcher .... Martin Divoký
Captain .... Josef Víšo
Corporal .... Martin Divoký
Jikney .... Karel Jiskra
Jailor .... Karel Jiskra
1st schoolchild .... Tereza Havlíková
2nd schoolchild .... Barbora Fuksová
3rd schoolchild .... Žaneta Burešová
4th schoolchild .... Denisa Škorňová
5th schoolchild .... Lada Eliášová
1st Freelance .... Tomáš Válek
2nd Freelance .... Marek Harvan

References

External links 
Czechoslovak Film Database
Ty-já-tr Website

Czech plays
Comedy plays
Voskovec and Werich plays
1937 plays